Emmonak Airport  is a state-owned public-use airport located in Emmonak, a city in the Kusilvak Census Area of the U.S. state of Alaska.

Although most U.S. airports use the same three-letter location identifier for the FAA and IATA, this airport is assigned ENM by the FAA and EMK by the IATA. The airport's ICAO identifier is PAEM.

Facilities 
Emmonak Airport has one runway designated 16/34 with a gravel surface measuring 4,601 by 100 feet (1,402 x 30 m).

Airline and destinations 

Prior to its bankruptcy and cessation of all operations, Ravn Alaska served the airport from multiple locations.

Statistics

References

External links 
 FAA Alaska airport diagram (GIF)
 

Airports in the Kusilvak Census Area, Alaska